Palmer Gulch is a creeklet in San Mateo County, California and is a tributary of San Gregorio Creek.

Notes

Rivers of San Mateo County, California
Rivers of Northern California